A chawan (literally "tea bowl") is a bowl used for preparing and drinking tea. Many types of chawan are used in East Asian tea ceremonies. The choice of their use depends upon many considerations.

History

The chawan originated in China. The earliest chawan in Japan were imported from China between the 13th and the 16th centuries.

The Jian chawan, a Chinese tea bowl known as Tenmoku chawan in Japan, was the preferred tea bowl for the Japanese tea ceremony until the 16th century. In Japan, tea was also mainly drunk from this Chinese variety of tea bowls until about the 15th century. The Japanese term tenmoku is derived from the name of the Tianmu Mountain, where Japanese priests acquired these tea bowls from Chinese temples to bring back to Japan, according to tradition.

An 11th-century resident of Fujian wrote about the Jian tea wares: 

By the end of the Kamakura period (1185–1333), as the custom of tea drinking spread throughout Japan and the Tenmoku chawan became desired by all ranks of society, the Japanese began to make their own copies in Seto (in present-day Aichi Prefecture). Although the Tenmoku chawan was derived from the original Chinese that came in various colors, shapes, and designs, the Japanese particularly liked the bowls with a tapered shape, so most Seto-made Tenmoku chawan had this shape.

With the rise of the wabi tea ceremony in the late Muromachi period (1336–1573), the Ido chawan, a variety of Korean bowls mainly used for rice in Korea, also became highly prized in Japan. Korean bowls were a favourite of tea master Sen no Rikyū because of their rough simplicity.

Over time and with the development of the Japanese tea ceremony as a distinct form, local ceramics became more highly priced and developed. Around the Edo period, the chawan was often made in Japan. 
The most esteemed pieces for a tea ceremony chawan are raku ware, Hagi ware, and Karatsu ware. A saying in the tea ceremony schools for the preferred types of chawan relates: "Raku first, Hagi second, Karatsu third."

Another chawan type that became slightly popular during the Edo period from abroad was the Annan ware from Vietnam (Annam), which were originally used there as rice bowls. Annan ware is blue and white, with a high foot.

Usage 
A cloth called chakin is used to wipe the bowl clean.

Types 
Japanese chawan have various shapes and types, many of which have specific names: 
 
 
 
 
 
  
 
 
 
 
  
  – formerly imported from the Korean port of Komogai/ (now part of Jinhae)

See also
 List of Japanese tea ceremony utensils
 Yunomi, teacups used in Japan for everyday use

References

External links

 JNT, Joy of the Noble Teacup: International Chawan Exhibition 
 Official page of an international traveling chawan Exhibition 
A Handbook of Chinese Ceramics from the Metropolitan Museum of Art

Chinese pottery
Food preparation utensils
Japanese tea utensils
Teaware
Pottery shapes